The O'Reilly Theater is a 650-seat theater building, opened on December 11, 1999, in Pittsburgh, Pennsylvania. Located at 621 Penn Avenue in downtown Pittsburgh's Cultural District, the O'Reilly Theater is actually a three-part building: The  theater (with a 150-seat rehearsal hall), a large parking garage called Theater Square, and the adjacent  Agnes R. Katz Plaza.

The Pittsburgh Cultural Trust built the new theater, designed by architect Michael Graves P.A., to create a downtown home for the Pittsburgh Public Theater theatrical company, as well as to create additional venues for theater, music, and other art performances. The O’Reilly venue features a thrust stage surrounded by the audience on three sides.

To pay for the $25 million cost of construction, gifts to the project included a naming gift in honor of Dr. Anthony O'Reilly from Mrs. Chryss O'Reilly and several current and past senior executives of the H.J. Heinz Company.

The O’Reilly was built by Turner Construction Company, opened on December 11, 1999, with the world premiere of King Hedley II, by the Pulitzer Prize winning playwright August Wilson.

Pittsburgh Merchantile Library
The building site of the Penn Avenue theater's history began in 1866 with the construction Mercantile Library Hall, a multipurpose library, lecture, and music hall.

Lyceum Theater
The mercantile hall evolved into the Bijou, Lyceum, Academy, and Variety, Pittsburgh's vaudeville houses, and then was razed and paved into a parking lot after the 1936 St. Patrick's Day flood. Teddy Roosevelt spoke at a national convention of the Order of the Moose at Lyceum Theater on his visit to Pittsburgh in July, 1917.

See also
Theatre in Pittsburgh

References

External links
O’Reilly Theater homepage
1915 image of Lyceum Theater
Modern comparison to historic Lyceum site

Theatres in Pittsburgh
Tony O'Reilly family
Michael Graves buildings
Theatres completed in 1999
1999 establishments in Pennsylvania
New Classical architecture